Samuel Cushman (June 8, 1783 – May 20, 1851) was an American attorney and politician in the U.S. state of New Hampshire. He served as a member of the United States House of Representatives and as a member of the New Hampshire House of Representatives in the 1800s.

Early life and career
Cushman was born in Portsmouth, New Hampshire, the son of Job Cushman and Priscilla Riple Cushman. He attended the common schools, studied law and was admitted to the bar. He began the practice of law in Portsmouth.

He served as judge of the Portsmouth police court and as county treasurer from 1823 to 1828. He was a member of the New Hampshire House of Representatives from 1833 to 1835. Cushman was nominated by President Andrew Jackson to be United States attorney for the district of New Hampshire but was not confirmed.

He was elected as a Jacksonian to the Twenty-fourth Congress and reelected as a Democrat to the Twenty-fifth Congress, serving from March 4, 1835 - March 4, 1839. Cushman served as chairman of the Committee on Commerce during the Twenty-fifth Congress. After leaving Congress, he was a United States Navy officer at Portsmouth from 1845 to 1849.

He died in Portsmouth in 1851 and was interred in the Proprietors’ Burying Ground.

Personal life
Cushman married Elsa Ann Salter in May 1813. They had eleven children. Cushman's mother died in July 1831.

References

Further reading
 "Speech of Mr. Cushman, of New Hampshire" by Samuel Cushman, 1839.

External links

Hon. Samuel Cushman, Portsmouth, N.H. Aged 66

	

1783 births
1851 deaths
Democratic Party members of the New Hampshire House of Representatives
Politicians from Portsmouth, New Hampshire
Jacksonian members of the United States House of Representatives from New Hampshire
Democratic Party members of the United States House of Representatives from New Hampshire
19th-century American politicians